Raja Muhammad Afzal Khan (1 March 1936 - 11 April 2020) was a Pakistani politician who was elected to the National Assembly of Pakistan four times and Senate of Pakistan once. He was the member of Pakistan Peoples Party.

Biography
In 1983, Raja Afzal started his political career by winning Jhelum Municipal Committee chairman election and later on from 1985 to 1999, he remained MNA and senator, mostly from the PML-N. In 2002, he could not contest the poll due to graduation bar and fielded his two sons Raja Asad and Raja Safdar as PML-N nominees on National Assembly seats of Jhelum and only Asad won but in 2008 his both sons won NA seats.

In 2012, he left the PML-N over differences on award of party ticket for a by-election. The vote was held after a provincial assembly seat fell vacant as Khadim Gharmala’s son Nadeem Khadim was held ineligible over dual nationality.

Although the senior politician had enjoyed a long association with the Sharif family and PML-N, they developed differences in late 2012. As a result, he along with his two sons had left the party and joined the PPP in January 2013.

Raja Afzal contested as a PPP nominee on two seats in the 2013 election but lost the poll. Later, he joined the PTI but he supported PML- N’s Raja Matloob Mehdi in the 2016 by-election against PTI’s Fawad Chaudhry. That was his last public political activity. He did not play any role in the July 2018 general election.

He died after a prolonged illness on 11 April 2020.

References 

1936 births
People from Jhelum District
Politicians from Jhelum

1935 births
2020 deaths